Obergiesing (Central Bavarian: Obagiasing) is a borough of Munich, about 3 miles south-east of the city center. The larger part is residential or a mix of business and residential, but there are also a number of recreational facilities.

Education

The Lycée Jean Renoir, a French international school, maintains its primary school campus in Giesing.

Gallery

See also
München-Giesing railway station

External links

References

Boroughs of Munich